Kingsburg is an unincorporated community in Bon Homme County, in the U.S. state of South Dakota.

History
Kingsburg was laid out in 1917, and named for Mike King, a local landowner. A post office called Kingsburg was established in 1913, and remained in operation until 1940.

References

Unincorporated communities in Bon Homme County, South Dakota
Unincorporated communities in South Dakota